Sekret Enigmy (The Secret of Enigma) is a Polish historical film directed by Roman Wionczek. It was released in 1979.

The film is based on Stanisław Strumph-Wojtkiewicz's book Sekret Enigmy.

Cast
 Tadeusz Borowski as Marian Rejewski
 Piotr Fronczewski as Jerzy Różycki
 Piotr Garlicki as Henryk Zygalski
 Tadeusz Pluciński
 Jerzy Kamas
 Janusz Zakrzeński
 Emil Karewicz
 Andrzej Szczepkowski
 Stanisław Mikulski
 Stanisław Zaczyk
 Jolanta Wołłejko
 Ewa Żukowska
 Tadeusz Szaniecki

References

External links
 

1979 films
Polish historical films
1970s Polish-language films
Cryptography in fiction
1970s historical films